Admiral Morgan may refer to:

Christopher Morgan (Royal Navy officer) (born 1939), British Royal Navy vice admiral
Henry Sturgis Morgan Jr. (1924–2011), U.S. Navy rear admiral 
John Morgan (admiral) (born 1950), U.S. Navy vice admiral

See also
Charles W. Morgan (naval officer) ((1790–1853), U.S. Navy commodore (admiral-equivalent rank)
Morgan Morgan-Giles (1914–2013), British Royal Navy rear admiral